Microbacterium endophyticum is a bacterium from the genus Microbacterium which has been isolated from the plant Halimione portulacoides from the Ria de Aveiro in Portugal.

References

External links
Type strain of Microbacterium endophyticum at BacDive -  the Bacterial Diversity Metadatabase	

endophyticum
Bacteria described in 2015